Maurandella is an obsolete genus of flowering plants in the plantain family, Plantaginaceae. Species formerly placed in Maurandella are placed in Maurandya and Holmgrenanthe.

 Maurandella antirrhiniflora (Humb. & Bonpl. ex Willd.) Rothm. is a synonym of Maurandya antirrhiniflora Humb. & Bonpl. ex Willd.
  Maurandella hederaefolia Rothm. is a synonym of Maurandya antirrhiniflora subsp. hederifolia (Rothm.) Elisens
 Maurandella petrophila (Coville & C.V. Morton) Rothm. is a synonym of Holmgrenanthe petrophila (Coville & C.V. Morton) Elisens

References

Historically recognized angiosperm genera